Leigh Academy Blackheath is an 11–18 mixed, free secondary school and sixth form in Blackheath, Greater London, England. It was established in September 2018 in temporary accommodation, with the first cohort of Year 7 pupils. It is part of the Leigh Academies Trust.

History 
The Education and Skills Funding Agency (ESFA) approved the school in January 2015, and 18 potential sites were considered. Plans were submitted for the former Blackheath Bluecoat school site, with detached playing fields in Hervey Road, during July 2018.

Interim school 
The school opened on a temporary site, Victoria House on Shooters Hill Road, in September 2018 with the first Year 7 cohort of 180 students and 45 staff. In September 2019 it moved, with Years 7 and 8 into custom-built temporary buildings on its new site, the former Blackheath Bluecoat School. It had to wait for possession until the St Mary Magdalene School, which was temporarily occupying the Bluecoat buildings, moved to itś new permanent home on the Greenwich Peninsula. The old Bluecoat buildings were demolished in preparation for the new school.

School building 

Bouygues UK was appointed as construction contractor for the £26M project, working with architect Stride Treglown who designed a standards-compliant, sustainable building. Completed in 2020, it is of a standard 3-storey (75m x 45m) block design with sports facilities in a smaller attached single storey (33m x 18m) block. Leigh divides its pupils in to colleges, similar to houses. Each college has its own set of classrooms, open spaces, toilets and staff working areas. Pastorally the pupils are split into vertical tutor groups within those colleges. The pupils share flexible library space, the specialist teaching areas, the studio and hall.

By comparison with a similar building in Rainham, Kent, the main 3-storey block has a figure eight-like structure, being built around two internal courtyards or atria. One houses the school hall and activity studio and is two storeys high; the other is larger and three storeys in height and is used as the dining area. The specialist teaching areas are around the hall; the general classrooms and staff rooms are around the dining atrium. The layout of the three floors here is identical, and these floors will each house the 'small schools within a school' colleges.

Curriculum 

The Leigh Academies Trust runs 23 academies along the A2 corridor incorporating many larger than average secondaries. In an interview, former chief executive Frank Green explained the small schools model of education as a way to prevent students from dropping out, and vertical tutor groups as a way that allows students to be supported by peers a couple of years their senior. The trust creates largely autonomous 'schools within a school' - analogous to houses in former times. In its consultation documents for the proposed school, the small school model is mentioned. The Leigh Academies Trust is an enthusiastic proponent of the IB (International Baccalaureate), adopting the Learner Profile, and offering an IB Middle Years Programme-compliant curriculum within its secondary schools.

Leigh Academy Blackheath has academy status so does not have to apply the National Curriculum. Instead, the IB Middle Years Programme is used in its two-year Key stage 3 phase. It is proposing to offer the L, A and B pathways. In common with all Leigh Academies Trust IB schools, and IB schools worldwide, it has a philosophy that all students should:
 Enjoy equal access
 Develop basic skills and specialist digital skills
 Develop creative thinking and problem solving throughout the learning process.
It offers its students in its care:
 the means to reach their full potential
 the challenge to work in  partnership and collaboration with industry
 the means to become powerful digital citizens by learning to use the technology and to use it to learn.

References

External links 
 

Leigh Academies Trust
Free schools in London
Secondary schools in the Royal Borough of Greenwich
Academies in the Royal Borough of Greenwich
Educational institutions established in 2018
2018 establishments in England